Wakanohana may refer to:

Wakanohana Kanji I (1928–2010), sumo wrestler, the 45th Yokozuna
Wakanohana Kanji II (1953–2022), sumo wrestler, the 56th Yokozuna
Wakanohana Masaru (born 1971), sumo wrestler, the 66th Yokozuna